Hejdeby is a populated area, a socken (not to be confused with parish), on the Swedish island of Gotland. It comprises the same area as the administrative Hejdeby District, established on 1January 2016.

Geography 
Hejdeby is situated in the northwest part of Gotland, just east of Visby. The medieval Hejdeby Church is located in the socken. , Hejdeby Church belongs to Hejdeby parish in Romaklosters pastorat.

References

External links 

Objects from Hejdeby at the Digital Museum by Nordic Museum

Populated places in Gotland County